Dahimi may refer to:
 Dahimi 1 (disambiguation)
 Dahimi 2 (disambiguation)
 Dahimi 3